Erik Thomsen (born 14 December 1935) is a Danish wrestler. He competed in the men's Greco-Roman lightweight at the 1960 Summer Olympics.

References

1935 births
Living people
Danish male sport wrestlers
Olympic wrestlers of Denmark
Wrestlers at the 1960 Summer Olympics
Sportspeople from Copenhagen